The Graduate Institute of Development Studies (GIDS, French: Institut universitaire d’études du développement, IUED) was a graduate school in Geneva, Switzerland focusing on development studies. Created in 1961 as the Institut Africain de Genève (African Institute of Geneva), GIDS's stated goal was to promote teaching and research concerning international development and to encourage students from the Global South.

History
The GIDS trained several generations of development activists in Switzerland and in the world (including at PhD level after 1995) and was at the center of a huge international network. Very active in concrete development projects, the GIDS was also known in the francophone world for proposing an alternative and a critical view of development aid and world affairs [7], as well as for its journal, the Cahiers de l'IUED. It was also among the pioneer institutions in Europe for the intellectual development of the sustainable development perspective. Among its directors were Roy Preiswerk, Pierre Bungener, Jacques Forster (actual head of IHEID Foundation Board), Jean-Luc Maurer and Michel Carton. GIDS was attached to, but independent of, the University of Geneva.

GIDS and the Graduate Institute of International Studies (HEI) are now integrated in a new institution, since the beginning of 2008, the Graduate Institute of International and Development Studies (IHEID). The new Institute combines the fields of development and international relations and offers a much wider choice of teaching and research activities. The degree programmes of each previous institution (master's and Ph.D. in development studies, master's in international affairs, master's and Ph.D. in international studies) continue to be offered by the new combined institution.

Prominent graduates
Duarte Pio, Portuguese Duke of Braganza and claimant to the throne of Portugal
Juan Gasparini, Argentinian journalist and writer
Carlos Lopes, Executive Director of the United Nations Institute for Training and Research and Assistant-Secretary General to the United Nations
Alpha Oumar Konaré, ex-president of Mali.
François Lumumba, son of ex-Congo president.
Celia Guevara, sister of the Che.
Riadh Sidaoui, writer and political scientist.
Rudolf Ramsauer, EconomieSuisse.
Nicolas Imboden, diplomat and manager at SGS.
Dominique Biedermann, Foundation Ethos.
Esther Mamarbachi, journalist.
Antonio Hodgers, conseiller national, Berne.

Prominent faculty
Cruz Melchor Eya Nchama
Gilbert Rist
Jean Ziegler, Swiss sociologist
Jacques Forster
Pierre Bungener
Jean-Pierre Gontard
Fabrizio Sabelli
Jacques Grinevald
Riccardo Bocco
Isabelle Milbert
Marc Hufty
Jean-Luc Maurer
Jean-Michel servet
Rolf Steppacher
Daniel Fino
Marie-Dominique Perrot
Christian Comeliau
Yvonne Preiswerk
Ariane Deluz
Andras November
Gérald Berthoud
Claude Auroi
Giorgio Blundo
Isabelle Schulte-Tenkhoff
Alessandro Monsutti
Jean-Daniel Rainhorn
Jean-Pierre jacob
Ronald Jaubert
Philippe Regnier
Yvan Droz
Pape Diouf
François Piguet
Christophe Golay
Christophe Gironde
Antoine Kernen
Fenneke Reysoo
Michel Carton
Gérard Peroulaz
Christine Verschuur
Gilles Carbonnier
Pascal van Griethuysen

References

External links
Official Graduate Institute of Development Studies website 

Graduate Institute of International and Development Studies
Defunct universities and colleges in Switzerland
Development studies
Education in Geneva
Educational institutions established in 1961
Educational institutions disestablished in 2008
Postgraduate schools
1961 establishments in Switzerland
2008 disestablishments in Switzerland